Risalamande ( also spelled as ) is a traditional Danish dessert served at Christmas dinner and julefrokost (Christmas lunch). It is made of rice pudding mixed with whipped cream, sugar, vanilla, and chopped almonds. It is served cold with either warm or cold cherry sauce (kirsebærsovs).

Etymology

The name is based on French  meaning , although the dessert has a Danish origin. Today risalamande is the spelling authorized by the Danish Language Council.

History
Risalamande was clearly inspired by the classical French dessert of riz à l'impératrice (empress rice) which is more solid, shaped in moulds and decorated with raspberry jelly.

Risalamande was created in the late 19th century. It gained popularity when rice pudding became more common. Until then rice pudding had been an exclusive dish, requiring two expensive, imported ingredients: almonds and cinnamon.

After World War II, risalamande experienced an increase in popularity, being touted as a "savings" dessert: adding whipped cream (which was easily available) to the still fairly expensive rice would make the rice last longer. In order to minimize costs, risalamande was frequently made without almonds during this time, too.

Use in Christmas tradition
Simple rice pudding (risengrød) can be served all year in Denmark, but is also often seen as a Christmas dish. It is served hot and topped with cinnamon and butter, often along with malt beer (hvidtøl).

Some families make a large batch of rice pudding for dinner on December 23 ( meaning ) and keep a part of it for preparing risalamande as a dessert after the big Christmas dinner. Others eat hot rice pudding as part of the Christmas dinner, usually as a starter and more rarely as a dessert. This is often regarded as an older tradition than the risalamande.

According to tradition, hot rice pudding is also the dish eaten by nisser, the Christmas elfs, which is common in other Nordic countries too. As such, children may put out a bowl of rice pudding, and if eaten (possibly by a cat, or more often, the parents), it will demonstrate the existence of the nisse. This usage is derived from the ancient belief in house spirits.

On Christmas Eve, a whole almond is added to the dessert, and the person who finds it wins a small prize such as a marzipan pig, a chocolate heart or a small board game. The finder may conceal their discovery as long as possible, so that the rest of the partygoers are forced to eat the entire dish of risalamande, even after they have already devoured a large Christmas dinner.

In Sweden, Finland, and Norway 

In Sweden, this dish is called ris à la Malta, which is a corruption of the Danish name. Typically it is made of chilled leftover rice pudding, whipped cream, sugar and vanilla, with or without almonds. By tradition, the person finding a hidden almond in the dessert is expected to get married before the next Christmas. A variety containing diced oranges is called apelsinris. The dish is mostly served with either a smooth cordial, jam or semi-thawed frozen berries.

In Finland, this dish is called Maltan riisi, 
Typically it is made of chilled leftover rice pudding, whipped cream, sugar and vanilla, with or without almonds. By tradition, the person finding a hidden almond in the dessert is very lucky whole year. 
In Finland, it can be served with puree made of raspberry (or even lingonberry) or raisin compote.

Norwegians have a similar dish called   and, as in Denmark, the person finding a hidden almond in the dessert wins a mandelgave (almond present) in the form of a marzipan pig or the like. The dessert may contain almonds for flavour, but mostly chopped on top as decoration. In Norway, the sauce is also normally made of raspberry (or even strawberry) rather than cherry.

Risifrutti 

Risifrutti is a ready-to-eat snack product inspired by risalamande, sold in the Nordic countries since 1993. Various sauces exist, such as strawberry, cherry, blueberry, and raspberry.

However, ready-to-eat products marketed as risalamande (and more similar to the actual dessert) also exist.

See also
 Glorified rice
 Danish cuisine
 List of Christmas dishes: Denmark
 Christmas worldwide: Denmark

References

Danish desserts
Danish culture
Swedish desserts
Finnish desserts
Rice pudding
Christmas food
Christian cuisine